The Elementals is a fictional organization appearing in American comic books published by Marvel Comics.

A variation of the Elementals appeared in the 2019 Marvel Cinematic Universe film Spider-Man: Far From Home.

Publication history
The Elementals first appeared in Supernatural Thrillers #8 (August 1974), and were created by Tony Isabella and Val Mayerik.

The group subsequently appears in Supernatural Thrillers #9–15 (October 1974 – October 1975)  and Ms. Marvel #11–12 (November–December 1977).

Fictional biography
The Elementals are four extradimensional humanoids who became immortals with power over natural forces and ruled a kingdom on Earth before the rise of the original Atlantis. They are Hydron, lord of the waters; Magnum, master of the earth; Hellfire, wielder of flame; and Zephyr, mistress of the winds. The Elementals used N'Kantu, the Living Mummy as a pawn against the Living Monolith to obtain the Ruby Scarab from them. However, Zephyr betrayed the other Elementals and allied with N'Kantu. The Elementals attacked Zephyr, the Living Mummy, and their allies and gained the Scarab from them. When the Elementals tried to release their energies through the Scarab, they were blasted off Earth.

The Elementals were later returned to Earth and pursued Zephyr and the Scarab, coming into conflict with the entity Hecate. Taking Zephyr hostage, Hellfire and Hydron forced her allies to recover the Scarab. Ms. Marvel arrived and together with Hecate, fought the Elementals, defeating them one by one.

During the 2008 — 2009 "Dark Reign" storyline, Quasimodo researched the Elementals alongside other villains for Norman Osborn. He speculated that they could be aliens from the Axi-Tun or the Horusians.

The Elementals were later captured by the Collector, save for Zephyr.

Team lineup
 Hellfire – The leader of the villainous group, who can generate fire and flames. 
 Hydron – A foe with aquatic powers, including the ability to control water.
 Magnum – He has abilities that allow manipulation of earth, minerals, and rock.
 Zephyr – The sole female of the team who has the power to control wind, sky and air and thereby affect many of its aspects.

In other media
A variation of the Elementals appear in the 2019 live-action film Spider-Man: Far From Home. This version of the group consists of the Wind, Earth, Fire, and Water Elemental, who are modeled after Cyclone, Sandman, Molten Man, and Hydro-Man respectively.

References

External links
 
 

Characters created by Tony Isabella
Characters created by Val Mayerik
Comics characters introduced in 1974
Fictional characters with immortality
Marvel Comics extraterrestrial supervillains